Barry Peterson is a Canadian-American cinematographer.

Born in Alberta, Canada, Peterson initially worked in special visual effects on various productions before moving into live action cinematography, where he began shooting commercials for companies such as Apple, Pepsi and Nike. Peterson is father to two sons.

As a cinematographer, Peterson's first credited film was 1993's Mustard Bath. When he moved to Los Angeles, Peterson was hired as the director of photography for Ben Stiller's Zoolander, which would quickly lead to work on numerous studio films. Barry has worked frequently with directors Rawson Marshall Thurber, Phil Lord and Christopher Miller & John Francis Daley and Jonathan Goldstein.

In television, Peterson worked on the pilot episodes of the series The Cape, Brooklyn Nine-Nine and The Good Place.

Filmography

Film

Television

References

External links
Barry Peterson at the Internet Movie Database
Official website

Canadian cinematographers
Living people
People from Alberta
Year of birth missing (living people)